This is a partial list of valleys of South Tyrol, a mountainous province in northern Italy, bordering Austria and Switzerland. Most valleys have two names, a German and an Italian one. Those in the Ladin-speaking areas have three names.